The Howse River is a tributary of the North Saskatchewan River in western Alberta, Canada.

The Howse River is a braided river, with several streams crossing in its flood plain. It is formed when Freshfield, Forbes, David and Lagoon Creek unite and flow north to discharge into the North Saskatchewan River at Saskatchewan River Crossing.

From the headwaters of Forbes Creek, the river has a total length of 33 km.

See also
 List of rivers of Alberta

Rivers of Alberta
Banff National Park
North Saskatchewan River